3 Knocks is the only studio album by Australian ambient music band, Pendulum. The album was released in 1997, and consisted of two discs. The first disc, called Well Being, contained new material, while the second disc, Exploitation, contained songs released in earlier years (1994 through 1996).

The album included three singles and received positive reception from Mixmag, DJ and Rolling Stone.

"Coma" won the ARIA Award for Best Dance Release at the ARIA Music Awards of 1997.

Track listing

References

1997 debut albums
Pendulum (ambient band) albums